Palm Beach is a seaside town in Ugu District Municipality in the KwaZulu-Natal province of South Africa.

Etymology
Palm Beach is named after the Ilala Palm (hyphaene critina), a species indigenous to sub-tropical Southern Africa and used by rural communities for centuries. The trees' leaves are used for woven rooftops, baskets and mats and the sap is used for liquor.

Geography
Palm Beach is located on the southern bank of the Mpenjati River which enters the Indian Ocean at the Mpenjati Nature Reserve.  

The Mpenjati Nature Reserve surrounds the Mpenjati River lagoon and extends some 500 metres out to sea in order to protect the unique fossil found in the area.

Beach
The village boasts a beach with its own natural tidal pool and nearby estuary. This beach is patrolled by lifeguards as well as shark-spotters.

Kitesurfing
Palm Beach has been and continues to be rated as one of the best wind sport wave riding venues in the world although it is not exploited much by kitesurfers.

Palm Beach is a microcosm on its own. It is in fact the combination of an outer reef, a rocky outcrop in the form of a point and a river system that feeds sand into the equation that makes this place unique. The outer reef transforms the ocean swells into sought after waves while at the same time disarming the waves' explosive energy.

References

Populated places in the Ray Nkonyeni Local Municipality
Populated coastal places in South Africa
Nude beaches
KwaZulu-Natal South Coast